Kahiltna Dome is a  mountain in the central Alaska Range, in Denali National Park,  west of Denali. It is separated from Denali by a deep glacial valley occupied by Kahiltna Glacier, with Kahiltna Pass at its head. It is described as an ice-covered dome, the 56th-highest peak in Alaska.

See also
Mountain peaks of Alaska

References

Alaska Range
Mountains of Denali Borough, Alaska
Mountains of Alaska
Denali National Park and Preserve